Mary Lindley Murray is known in the American Revolution as the Quaker woman who in 1776 held up British General William Howe after the British victory against American forces at Kips Bay.

Life
Mary Lindley was the daughter of Thomas Lindley (1684-1743) who was a member of the Quaker religion and an Irish immigrant. Thomas Lindley's father James Lindley (b. 1641) likely came to Ireland from England in his youth. Her mother was Hannah Duborow who was the daughter of a Quaker brewer in Philadelphia.

She married Robert Murray in 1744 and her first child Lindley Murray was born the following year, the first of 11 children. Lindley would grow to become the author of 11 books and the top selling author in the United States during the first four decades of the nineteenth century.

According to James Thatcher, a surgeon travelling with Washington's army, Murray treated Howe and his generals to cake and wine and delayed them several hours as the American rebels got away safely and undetected. As Thatcher puts it: 
When retreating from New York, Major General Putnam, at the head of three thousand five hundred continental troops, was in the rear and the last that left the city. In order to avoid any of the enemy that might be advancing in the direct road to the city, he made choice of a road parallel with and contiguous to the North River, till he could arrive at a certain angle, whence another road would conduct him in such a direction as that he might form a junction with our army. It so happened that a body of about eight thousand British and Hessians were at the same moment advancing on the road, which would have brought them in immediate contact with General Putnam, before he could have reached the turn into the other road. Most fortunately, the British generals, seeing no prospect of engaging our troops, halted their own, and repaired to the house of a Mr. Robert Murray, a Quaker and friend of our cause; Mrs. Murray treated them with cake and wine, and they were induced to tarry two hours or more, Governor Tryon frequently joking her about her American friends. By this happy incident General Putnam, by continuing his march, escaped a rencounter with a greatly superior force, which must have proved fatal to his whole party. One half hour, it is said, would have been sufficient for the enemy to have secured the road at the turn, and entirely cut off General Putnam s retreat. It has since become almost a common saying among our officers, that Mrs. Murray saved this part of the American army.

Elizabeth Fries Ellet, writing in her groundbreaking volume The Women of the American Revolution, said that 
One of her descendants has communicated a few additional particulars concerning her. Her maiden name was Mary Lindley, and she was of a Quaker family. She was born in Pennsylvania, and resided in that colony for some years after her marriage to Robert Murray. Her eldest son, Lindley—so extensively known for his work on the grammar of the English language—was born at the town of Swatara, near Lancaster. In 1753, she removed with her family to the city of New York, where her husband Robert Murray became one of the wealthiest and most respected merchants in the city.  Mrs. Murray is remembered in the family tradition as a person of great dignity and stateliness of deportment. Her disposition is described by a tribute to her memory in the memoirs of her son, Lindley Murray: "My mother was a woman of amiable disposition, and remarkable for mildness, humanity and liberality of sentiment. She was indeed a faithful and affectionate wife, a tender mother, and a kind mistress. I recollect with emotions of affection and gratitude her unwearied solicitude for my health and happiness."

The scene of Mary Murray's detention of the British officers took place in the neighborhood of Manhattan now known as Murray Hill.

In popular culture

The tale is the basis of the Rodgers and Hart musical Dearest Enemy and the 1957 play Small War on Murray Hill.

A Staten Island Ferry named the Mary Murray was launched in 1937 and in service until 1975.

References

Women in the American Revolution
American Quakers
People of New York (state) in the American Revolution
1782 deaths
Murray Hill, Manhattan
Year of birth unknown
1720 births